The Relay program consisted of Relay 1 and Relay 2, two early American satellites in elliptical medium Earth orbit.  Both were primarily experimental communications satellites funded by NASA and developed by RCA. As of December 2, 2016, both satellites were still in orbit. Relay 1 provided the first American television transmissions across the Pacific Ocean.

Relay 1 
Relay 1 was launched atop a Delta B rocket on December 13, 1962, from LC-17A at Cape Canaveral Air Force Station. Its payload included radiation experiments designed to map the Earth's radiation belts. Apogee was 7500 km; perigee 1300. The spin-stabilized satellite had an initial spin rate of 167.3 rpm and an initial spin axis orientation with a declination of -68.3 deg and a right ascension of -56 deg. Its orbital period was 185.09 minutes. Shortly after launch, two basic problems evolved. One was the satellite's response to spurious commands, and the other was the leakage of a high-power regulator. This leakage caused the first two weeks of satellite operation to be useless. After this period, satellite operation returned to normal. The satellite carried one transmitter for tracking and one for telemetry. The telemetry system was PCM at 1152 bit/s. Each 128 words per telemetry frame (of one second duration) used 113 words for the particle experiment. The leakage problem caused the spacecraft to revert to a low voltage state early in 1965. Sporadic transmission occurred until February 10, 1965, after which no usable scientific data was obtained.

Relay 1 was the first satellite to broadcast television from the United States to Japan. The first broadcast during orbit 2677 (1963-11-22, 2027:42-2048 (GMT), or 1:27 pm Dallas time) was to be a prerecorded address from the president of the United States to the Japanese people, but was instead the announcement of the John F. Kennedy assassination. On orbit 2678, this satellite carried a broadcast titled Record, Life of the Late John F. Kennedy, the first television program broadcast simultaneously in the U.S. and Japan. In later orbits, NBC transmitted coverage of the funeral procession from the White House to the cathedral. In the three days following the Kennedy assassination, Relay 1 handled a total of 11 spot broadcasts; eight to Europe and three to Japan. All the useful passes of the satellite were made available to permit immediate coverage of the tragic events.

In August 1964, this satellite was used as the United States-Europe link for the broadcast of the 1964 Summer Olympics from Tokyo, after the signal was relayed to the United States via Syncom 3. This marked the first time that two satellites were used in tandem for a television broadcast.

COSPAR satellite ID: Relay 1 1962-Beta-Upsilon 1 (62BU1)

Relay 2 
Relay 2 was launched atop a Delta B rocket on January 21, 1964, from LC-17B at Cape Canaveral Air Force Station. Apogee 7600 km; perigee 1870 km. It was physically similar to Relay 1. Design changes in this satellite improved its performance so response to spurious commands was essentially eliminated.

NASA ceased operations with Relay 2 on September 26, 1965, with the repurposing of the Mojave Desert Ground Station, the only one in the world equipped to communicate with the satellite, for use with the Applications Technology Satellite program. The final broadcast was of Sen. B. Everett Jordon (D-N.C.) opening the week-long International Exposition of the American Textile Machinery Association in Exposition Hall in Atlantic City.

One of the two onboard transponders operated normally until November 20, 1966. From that time until its failure on January 20, 1967, it required a longer time than normal to come on. The other transponder continued to operate until June 9, 1967, when it too failed to operate normally.

COSPAR satellite ID: Relay 2 1964-003A

See also

 List of communications satellite firsts
 Launch data:
 1962 in spaceflight (July–December) (Relay 1)
 1964 in spaceflight (January–June) (Relay 2)
 State funeral of John F. Kennedy

References

External links
 NASA Space Science Data Center description:
 Relay 1
 Relay 2
 NASA FACTS PROJECT RELAY G-12-62

1962 in spaceflight
NASA programs
History of telecommunications
Communications satellites
Satellites orbiting Earth
1964 in spaceflight
Spacecraft launched in 1962
Spacecraft launched in 1964
Satellites of the United States